Mira Adanja Polak (born 22 August 1942) is a Serbian journalist, producer, researcher, author and TV host.

Her TV show Mira Adanja-Polak – Exclusive is broadcast weekly on Radio Television Serbia.

She has a large number of exclusive interviews with famous artists, politicians, businessmen, celebrities and royal family members.

Interviews include: Henry Kissinger, David Rockefeller, Lord Carrington, Lord David Owen, Robert MacNamara, Willy Brandt, Armand Hammer, Lawrence Eagleburger, Valery Giscard D'Estaing, Graham Greene, Fredrick Forsyth, Peter Ustinov, Igor Ustinov, Art Buchwald, Mstislav Rostropovic, Carlo Ponti, Sofia Loren, Shimon Peres, long lasting president of Israel, Heinz Fischer, president of Austria, Princess Elizabeth of Yugoslavia, Elie Wiesel, Oriana Falacci, Indira Gandhi, Barbara Walters, Dan Rather, David Bailey, Kirk Douglas, Jovanka Broz, Erica Jong, Princess Leonide Romanoff, Prince Michael Feodorovich Romanoff, Bojko Borisov, prime minister of Bulgaria, Borut Pahor, president of Slovenia, Ivo Pogorelic, pianist, Hugo Vickers, biographer of the British royal familly, Lord Aitken.

Investigative documentaries
Mira Adanja-Polak is the author of over 400 investigative documentaries:

 Risk of Love (New York) – introducing the problem of AIDS in Eastern Europe
 Hospis – the art of dying
 File on Russian Tsar
 Russian Cemetery in the West (Paris)
 Meeting the Son of Hitler's Assassin (Graf von Staufenberg) (Munich)
 Life of Aircraft Carrier Nimitz
 Royal Divorce (London)
 Christie's – New York
 Visit to a Women's Jail – Killing the Husband (Belgrade)
 Road of a Drug (Amsterdam)
 Widow of Communism (Tito's wife Jovanka Broz after 16 years of silence) (Belgrade)
 Hand of St. John the Baptist (Montenegro)
 Woman Without Breasts (Belgrade)
 Adopting a Handicapped Child
 Berlin Wall (Before and After)
 Behind Closed Doors (West on Balkans)
 Love Letters From Mileva to Albert Einstein
 The Balkans and Yugoslavia 1941–45
 Television series on AIDS

Working assignments

Foreign desk consultant for ITN in London – working on the Channel Four News programme. During the Bosnian Conflict she secured interviews for the programme with the Serbian President, Slobodan Miloševic, and the leaders of the Bosnian Serbs – Radovan Karadžic and General Ratko Mladic. These interviews were included in special reports on the crisis in Srebrenica. They achieved International Broadcasting awards for Channel Four News – ITN.

Field Producer for People Magazine (New York) on the first visit of Royal family to Belgrade after 60 years of exile presenting the new elected President Vojislav Koštunica to Western world in special profile, NBC TV's Nightline programme – covering the visit of Princess Elizabeth of Yugoslavia to her native country.

Contributor for The Dictionary of Art (London) – supplying various articles and photographs on Eastern European Art.

Exclusive Reports for Royalty Magazine (London).

Consultant to ABC Television – Pierre Salinger's Broadcasts – during the 1984 Winter Olympics in Sarajevo.

Publications

 Amerikanci (The Americans) – the result of research into American Society.

Publication entries about Mira Adanja-Polak

 International Who's Who 2013, Routledge, Taylor and Francis Group
 The International Who's Who of Women 2002
 International Headers in Achievement 1991
 International Who's Who of Intellectuals 1992
 British National Union of Journalist Freelance Directory
 Who's Who (Yugoslavia)

References

External links
 

Serbian journalists
Living people
1942 births
Writers from Budapest
Serbian women writers
Serbian writers
Serbian television personalities
University of Belgrade Faculty of Philosophy alumni